Rankin-Harwell House, also known as The Columns, Carolina Hall, and the James Harwell House, is a historic plantation house located near Florence, Florence County, South Carolina.  It was built in 1857, and is a two-story, frame, Greek Revival style dwelling.  It features 22 giant freestanding Doric order stuccoed brick columns that surround the house on three sides.  It rests on a raised basement and has a low-pitched hipped roof.

It was listed on the National Register of Historic Places in 1974.

References

External links

Historic American Buildings Survey in South Carolina
Plantation houses in South Carolina
Houses on the National Register of Historic Places in South Carolina
Greek Revival houses in South Carolina
Houses completed in 1857
Houses in Florence County, South Carolina
National Register of Historic Places in Florence County, South Carolina
Buildings and structures in Florence, South Carolina
1857 establishments in South Carolina